Sheikh Riaz Ahmad (Urdu : ; born 9 March 1938) was a former Chief Justice of Pakistan of the Supreme Court of Pakistan from February 1, 2002 to December 31, 2003.

Overview
Justice Sheikh Riaz Ahmad was elevated to the Supreme Court of Pakistan on February 1, 2002. Prior to this elevation, he served as a Judge Supreme Court of Pakistan (1997–2002), Chief Justice of Lahore High Court (1997)and Judge Lahore High Court, Punjab - the largest province of Pakistan (1984–1997). Justice Ahmad worked as the Advocate General of the Punjab Province from 1980–84; and as Assistant Advocate General Punjab (1973–80).He graduated from the Government Islamia College, Civil Lines, Lahore. He was called to bar in 1959 and was a practicing criminal lawyer as well as a lecturer at the Punjab University Law College.

Justice Ahmad also served as the Member Election Commission of Pakistan from 1990–93 and later he was appointed as the Federal Secretary Law, Justice and Parliamentary Affairs under the second Government of Prime Minister Benazir Bhutto.

See also
 Chief Justices of Pakistan

References

1938 births
Chief justices of Pakistan
Living people
20th-century Pakistani judges
Chief Justices of the Lahore High Court
University of the Punjab alumni
Government Islamia College alumni
21st-century Pakistani judges